In the 2006 Campeonato da 1ª Divisão do Futebol, Lam Pak won the championship.

League standings

References

Campeonato da 1ª Divisão do Futebol seasons
Macau
Macau
1